The following is a list of notable deaths in November 1993.

Entries for each day are listed alphabetically by surname. A typical entry lists information in the following sequence:
 Name, age, country of citizenship at birth, subsequent country of citizenship (if applicable), reason for notability, cause of death (if known), and reference.

November 1993

1
Maeve Brennan, 76, Irish short story writer and journalist.
Freda Corbet, 92, British politician.
Georges Dancigers, 85, Russian-French film producer.
Naina Devi, 76, Indian vocalist of Hindustani classical music.
Clément Dupont, 94, French rugby player.
Pinkie George, 88, American professional wrestling promoter and boxer.
Mervyn Jayathunga, 53, Sri Lankan actor.
Loelia Lindsay, 91, British peeress and magazine editor.
Severo Ochoa, 88, Spanish physician, biochemist, and Nobel Prize laureate.
George A. Sheehan, 74, American physician and sports writer, prostate cancer.
A. N. Sherwin-White, 82, British ancient historian and academic.
Frank Sundström, 81, Swedish actor.
Sir Arthur Ward, 87, New Zealand dairy researcher and university administrator.
Salgado Zenha, 70, Portuguese lawyer and politician.

2
Đuro Kurepa, 86, Yugoslav mathematician.
Butch Nieman, 75, American Major League Baseball player.
Fred Williams, 80, American baseball player.
Jean-Claude Wuillemin, 50, French cyclist.

3
Richard Bayha, 64, German politician member of the Bundestag.
H. G. Callan, 76, English zoologist and cytologist.
Aidan Crawley, 85, British journalist, television executive, and politician.
Duncan Gibbins, 41, British film and music video director, and screenwriter, burns.
Arnold Hamer, 76, English cricket player.
William Lanteau, 70, American actor (Newhart, On Golden Pond, From Noon till Three).
John Lupton, 65, American actor (Broken Arrow, Days of Our Lives, Julius Caesar).
Redmond Phillips, 81, New Zealand actor (Tom Jones, A Night to Remember, Spyforce).
Leon Theremin, 97, Russian and Soviet inventor.
Henri Thomas, 80, French writer and poet.
Vuko Vukadinović, 56, Yugoslav and Montenegrin communist.

4
Daniel Barrow, 84, American rower and Olympian.
Jackie Callura, 76, Canadian featherweight boxer.
Cem Ersever, 43, Turkish Army officer, murdered.
Allan Hoover, 86, British-American mining engineer, rancher, and financier.
Ely Landau, 73, American film producer and executive, stroke.
Nerina Montagnani, 96, Italian actress, pneumonia.
Seongcheol, 81, Korean Buddhist monk.
Cliff Young, 29, American baseball player, traffic accident.

5
Basuki Abdullah, 78, Indonesian painter, beaten to death.
Michael Bilton, 73, English actor.
Mario Cecchi Gori, 73, Italian film producer and businessman.
Bertil Lundman, 94, Swedish anthropologist.
Tadeusz Pankiewicz, 84, Polish pharmacist and resistance member during World War II.
Arthur Rowe, 87, English football player and  manager.

6
Zena Abbott, 71, New Zealand weaver.
Torsten Fenslau, 29, German disc jockey and music producer, traffic collision.
Jack Hennemier, 80, American gridiron football coach and scout.
Alexandru Piru, 76, Romanian literary critic and historian.
Georges Reeb, 72, French mathematician.
Ed Sadowski, 62, American Major League Baseball player, ALS.
Joseph Serchuk, 74, Polish partisan during World War II.
Ralph Randles Stewart, 103, American botanist.
Michael Vernon, 61, Australian consumer rights activist, multiple myeloma.

7
Charles Aidman, 68, American actor, cancer.
Clemente Gaddi, 91, Italian prelate of the Catholic Church.
Adelaide Hall, 92, American jazz singer and entertainer, pneumonia.
Jon Hernandez, 24, Filipino actor, traffic collision.
Nikolay Kostylev, 62, Russian weightlifter.
Terris Moore, 85, American explorer and mountaineer, president of the University of Alaska, heart attack.
Yuri Osmanov, 52, Soviet and Crimean Tatar civil rights activist, murdered.
Walt Rankin, 74, American National Football League player.
Tex Shirley, 75, American baseball player.
Jack Martin Smith, 82, American art director (Cleopatra, Fantastic Voyage, Planet of the Apes), Oscar winner (1964, 1967, 1970).
Andrey Tikhonov, 87, Soviet mathematician and geophysicist.

8
Erik Beijar, 72, Finnish football player.
Dick Cathcart, 69, American dixieland trumpet player, cancer.
Marcello Landi, 77, Italian painter and poet.
Hank Leiber, 82, American baseball player.
James Moffat, 71, Canadian-born British novelist.
Francisco Zuluaga, 64, Colombian football player.

9
Saqr III bin Sultan al-Qasimi, 68, Emirate of Sharjah ruler.
Ross Andru, 66, American comic book artist (Wonder Woman, Spider-Man, The Punisher).
Anatols Dinbergs, 82, Latvian diplomat.
Godfrey Lienhardt, 72, British anthropologist, pneumonia.
Angus Maude, 81, British politician.
Stanley Myers, 63, English film composer (The Deer Hunter, The Witches, Rosencrantz & Guildenstern Are Dead), cancer.
Vishnudevananda Saraswati, 65, Indian yoga guru.
Anne Smith, 52, British middle-distance runner and Olympian, stroke.
Gerald Thomas, 72, English film director (Carry On), heart attack.

10
Artashes Arakelian, 84, Soviet and Armenian economist and academic.
Alberto Breccia, 74, Uruguay-Argentine artist and cartoonist.
Justin O'Byrne, 81, Australian politician.
Paul Oßwald, 88, German football player and manager.
Wensley Pithey, 79, South African actor (Oliver!, Coronation Street, Charlesworth).

11
Dragomir Bojanić, 60, Serbian actor and humorist, liver cancer.
Franco Evangelisti, 70, Italian politician.
Mildred Fizzell, 78, Canadian athlete and Olympian.
Andrew Gregory Grutka, 84, American bishop of the Catholic Church.
Erskine Hawkins, 79, American trumpeter and big band leader.
Robert E. Hogaboom, 90, United States Marine Corps four-star general.
Osman Sabri, 88, Kurdish poet, writer and journalist.
Franco Sassi, 81, Italian painter, printmaker and engraver.
John Stanley, 79, American cartoonist and comic book writer (Little Lulu)

12
Bill Dickey, 86, American baseball player and manager.
Keith Flowers, 63, American gridiron football player.
H. R. Haldeman, 67, American political aide and White House Chief of Staff, stomach cancer.
Dria Paola, 83, Italian actress.
William Haggin Perry, 82, American owner and breeder of thoroughbred racehorses.
Ted Ringwood, 63, Australian experimental geophysicist and geochemist.
Anna Sten, 84, Ukrainian-American actress.
George Taylor, 89, Scottish botanist, heart attack.
Jill Tweedie, 57, British feminist, writer and broadcaster, ALS.

13
Jack Fulton, 90, American composer, trombonist, and vocalist.
Rufus R. Jones, 60, American professional wrestler, heart attack.
George Taylor, 89, Scottish botanist, heart attack.
G. K. Venkatesh, 66, Indian film score composer.

14
András Béres, 69, Hungarian football player and manager.
Manibhai Desai, 73, Indian economist and social activist.
Vũ Hồng Khanh, 95, Vietnamese revolutionary.
Sanzō Nosaka, 101, Japanese communist politician.
Ya'akov Shimshon Shapira, 91, Israeli jurist and Socialist Zionist politician.
Kim Won-yong, 71, South Korean archaeologist and art historian.

15
Jack Finch, 84, English football player.
Yelena Gogoleva, 93, Soviet and Russian actress.
Luciano Leggio, 68, Italian criminal and Sicilian Mafia leader, heart attack.
Jimmy McAlinden, 75, Irish football player.
Cvijetin Mijatović, 80, Yugoslav communist politician.
Hal Mitchell, 63, American gridiron football player, cancer.
Viola Myers, 66, Canadian sprinter and Olympian.
Virgil Vătășianu, 91, Romanian academic and art historian.
Gladys Walton, 90, American silent film actress, cancer.

16
Yves Brainville, 79, French actor.
Tomàs Garcés, 92, Spanish lawyer and poet.
Lorenzo Hierrezuelo, 86, Cuban trova singer, guitarist, and composer.
Frank Mockler, 84, American attorney and politician.
Lucia Popp, 54, Slovak operatic soprano, brain cancer.
Ken Renard, 87, American actor (True Grit, Something of Value, Lydia Bailey).
Evelyn Venable, 80, American actress, cancer.
Achille Zavatta, 78, French clown, artist and circus operator, suicide.

17
Amy Jagger, 85, British Olympic artistic gymnast.
Gérard D. Levesque, 67, Canadian politician and Cabinet minister.
Giorgos Mitsakis, 72, Greek folk composer and lyricist.
Kiyoshi Nishimura, 61, Japanese filmmaker, suicide.
Teddy Powell, 88, American jazz musician and band leader.
Gordon Richards, 60, Welsh football player.

18
Fritz Feld, 93, German-American film actor.
Arvid Fladmoe, 78, Norwegian composer and conductor.
João Baptista Martins, 66, Portuguese football player, heart attack.
Rudolph Matt, 84, Austrian alpine skier and world champion.
Branko Radović, 59, Yugoslav basketball player and coach.

19
Kenneth Burke, 96, American literary theorist and author, heart attack.
Carlo Da Prà, 62, Italian Olympic bobsledder.
Leonid Gaidai, 70, Soviet and Russian comedy film director, pulmonary embolism.
Dorothy Revier, 89, American actress.
Sir John Stallworthy, 87, New Zealand-born British obstetrician and professor.
Norman Tindale, 93, Australian anthropologist, archaeologist, entomologist and ethnologist.

20
Emile Ardolino, 50, American film director, choreographer, and producer, AIDS-related complications.
Heather Farr, 28, American professional golfer, cancer.
Christopher Frank, 50, British-French writer, screenwriter, and film director, heart attack.
Eve van Grafhorst, 11, first Australian child to be infected with HIV via a blood transfusion.
Paul Guiragossian, 66, Armenian Lebanese painter.
Willi Rutz, 86, German football player and manager.

21
Bill Bixby, 59, American actor (The Incredible Hulk, My Favorite Martian, The Courtship of Eddie's Father), prostate cancer.
Margaret Boyd, 80, English lacrosse player and schoolteacher.
Masaru Furukawa, 57, Japanese swimmer and Olympic champion.
Fernand Picard, 87, French automotive engineer.
Stéphane Proulx, 27, Canadian racing driver, AIDS-related complications.
Bruno Rossi, 88, Italian experimental physicist.
Richard Wordsworth, 78, English actor.

22
P. A. Backer, 53, Indian Malayalam film director.
William Brinkley, 76, American writer and journalist, suicide.
Anthony Burgess, 76, English writer (A Clockwork Orange) and composer, lung cancer.
Alois De Hertog, 66, Belgian racing cyclist.
Alexander Langmuir, 83, American epidemiologist.
Lee Loy Seng, 72, Malaysian businessman.
Bill Laughlin, 77, American basketball player.
Tatiana Nikolayeva, 69, Soviet and Russian pianist and composer, stroke.
James Stern, 88, Anglo-Irish writer of short stories and non-fiction.
Elizabeth Threatt, 67, American model and actress.
Ernst von Klipstein, 85, German actor.
Joseph Yodoyman, 43, Chadian politician and civil servant.

23
William Holmes Borders, 88, American pastor and civil rights activist.
Grey Clarke, 81, American Major League Baseball player.
Pierre Ferri, 89, French stockbroker and politician.
Margit Kalocsai, 83, Hungarian gymnast and Olympian.

24
John Blythe, 72, English actor.
Albert Collins, 61, American electric blues guitarist and singer, lung cancer.
László Fenyvesi, 85, Hungarian football player and manager.
Grès, 89, French couturier and costume designer.
Tom Scott, 85, American college basketball coach.
Zhou Peiyuan, 91, Chinese theoretical physicist and politician.

25
Hervé Bromberger, 75, French film director and screenwriter.
Juan Carlos Castillo, 29, Colombian racing cyclist, shot.
Roman Durniok, 65, Polish football player and later manager.
Carl Lorenz, 79, German cyclist.
Claudia McNeil, 76, American actress (A Raisin in the Sun), diabetes.
Louis Leo Snyder, 86, American scholar.
Larry Uttal, 71, American music executive, AIDS.
Burgess Whitehead, 83, American Major League Baseball player.

26
Erwin Gillmeister, 86, German sprinter and Olympian.
César Guerra-Peixe, 79, Brazilian violinist, composer, and conductor.
Jarl Hjalmarson, 89, Swedish politician.
Dirk Albert Hooijer, 74, Dutch paleontologist.
Guido Masetti, 86, Italian football goalkeeper and manager.
Ali Mohsen, 53, Yemeni football player.
Grande Otelo, 78, Brazilian actor, comedian, singer, and composer, cardiovascular disease.
Saly Ruth Ramler, 99, Czech-American mathematician.
Bernardo Segall, 82, Brazilian-American composer and concert pianist.

27
James Gareth Endicott, 94, Canadian christian minister, missionary, and socialist.
Jerry Hunt, 49, American composer, suicide.
Einar Landvik, 95, Norwegian Nordic skier and Olympian.
Thaddeus Mann, 84, Polish biochemist.
Everett C. Olson, 83, American zoologist, paleontologist, and geologist.
William J. Trent, 83, American economist, executive director of United Negro College Fund.

28
Monroe Abbey, 89, Canadian lawyer and civic leader.
Eilif Armand, 72, Norwegian actor.
Pery Broad, 72, Brazilian Schutzstaffel non-commissioned officer.
Kenneth Connor, 75, English stage, film and broadcasting actor, cancer.
Tommie Connor, 89, English lyricist and songwriter.
Francis L. Dale, 72, American businessman and Major League Baseball executive.
Jerry Edmonton, 47, American musician, traffic collision.
June Gittelson, 83, American film actress.
Robert Hawkins, 39, American basketball player, shot.
Rudolf Keller, 76, German chess master.
Joe Kelly, 80, Irish racing driver.
Jim Leonard, 83, American National Football League player and coach.
Garry Moore, 78, American entertainer, comedian, and game show host, pulmonary emphysema.
Huang Oudong, 88, Chinese politician.
John Rokisky, 78, American gridiron football player.
Marian Dale Scott, 87, Canadian painter.
Camillo Togni, 71, Italian composer, teacher, and pianist.
Bruce Turner, 71, English jazz saxophonist, clarinetist, and bandleader.

29
Arnold Boghaert, 73, Belgian Roman Catholic bishop.
Alan Clare, 72, British jazz pianist and composer.
Peter Grushin, 87, Soviet rocket scientist and academic.
Sir Jack Longland, 88, English broadcaster, educator and mountain climber.
J. R. D. Tata, 89, Indian aviator, industrialist, and entrepreneur.
Thomas W. Whitaker, 89, American botanist and horticulturist.

30
David Houston, 57, American country music singer, stroke.
Wacław Jędrzejewicz, 100, Polish Army officer, diplomat, and politician.
Sebastian Kappen, 69, Indian Jesuit priest and theologian.
Hirubhai M. Patel, 89, Indian civil servant and politician.
Wogan Philipps, 2nd Baron Milford, 91, British communist politician and member of the House of Lords.
Tom Scannell, 68, Irish football player.
Bob Woolf, 65, American sports agent.

References 

1993-11
 11